Bill Gerrand (born 23 November 1941) is a former  Australian rules footballer who played with St Kilda in the Victorian Football League (VFL).

Notes

External links 

Living people
1941 births
Australian rules footballers from Victoria (Australia)
St Kilda Football Club players
South Bendigo Football Club players